KXTS-LD (channel 41) is a low-power television station in Victoria, Texas, United States, affiliated with CBS. It is owned by Morgan Murphy Media alongside ABC affiliate KAVU-TV (channel 25) and four other low-power stations: NBC affiliate KMOL-LD (channel 17), Univision affiliate KUNU-LD (channel 21), Cozi TV affiliate KQZY-LD (channel 33), and Telemundo affiliate KVTX-LD (channel 45). Morgan Murphy Media also provides certain services to Fox affiliate KVCT (channel 19) under a local marketing agreement (LMA) with SagamoreHill Broadcasting. All of the stations share studios on North Navarro Street in Victoria and transmitter facilities on Farm to Market Road 236 west of the city.

History
KXTS-LP signed on in 1994 as an NBC affiliate and later flipped to UPN. It then broadcast MyNetworkTV from September 2006 until September 2011 after the UPN and WB merger into The CW.

On September 12, 2011, KXTS-LP dropped MyNetworkTV completely (after it became a programming service in 2009 instead of a full TV network) and became the first CBS affiliate in the Victoria area.

KXTS converted to digital operations on January 5, 2012, and the callsign was changed to KXTS-LD. The station also added a second digital subchannel to carry classic programming from Antenna TV. KXTS is also carried along with two sister stations as a digital subchannel of KAVU-TV.

Technical information

Subchannels
The station's digital signal is multiplexed:

References

External links
Official website

Morgan Murphy Media stations
XTS-LD
Low-power television stations in the United States
CBS network affiliates
Antenna TV affiliates